Cpt James Francis Rigg (July 18, 1915 - July 11, 2004) from Saginaw, Michigan was a World War II Double Ace pilot who shot down eleven Japanese aircraft in the Pacific Theatre of World War II, including a Japanese Ace.

Education
Rigg was a student at the University of Michigan.

Career

In July 1937 he joined the U.S. Navy Air Corps and became a fighter pilot. During World War II Rigg as assigned to Fighter Squadron 15 (VF-15) and served on the USS Essex. Following the death of the squadron's commander Charles Walter Brewer, Rigg took over command of VF-15 on 19 June 1944 and served in that role until 15 January 1945. 

While in commanding his squadron of Hellcats in the Philippines, he shot down five Japanese aircraft in one day. He was also given credit for sinking an enemy Destroyer ship. His nickname was Speedy, and he was ranked the 12th Naval Ace of WWII. He was given credit for eleven and one half kills. He earned his reputation as part of the Carrier Air Group (CAG-15) commanded by David McCampbell.

Awards

Congressional Gold Medal (2015)
Navy Cross 
6 Distinguished Flying Crosses
Bronze Star Medal
10 Air medals
In 2004 he was inducted into the Rhode Island Aviation Hall of Fame

See also
List of World War II aces from the United States
List of World War II flying aces

References

Further reading

Notes

1915 births
2004 deaths
United States Navy pilots of World War II
American World War II flying aces
Military personnel from Michigan
United States Navy personnel of World War II
Recipients of the Distinguished Flying Cross (United States)